This Is the Way the World Ends may refer to:

"This is the way the world ends", a quotation from the 1925 poem "The Hollow Men" by T. S. Eliot
This Is the Way the World Ends (novel), a 1986 novel by James Morrow
"This Is the Way the World Ends" (Dexter), a 2011 episode of Dexter
 This Is the Way the World Ends: How Droughts and Die-offs, Heat Waves and Hurricanes Are Converging on America, a 2018 nonfiction book by Jeff Nesbit